PAOK FC history and statistics in UEFA competitions.

Match table

European Cup / UEFA Champions League

1: The first leg finished 2–1 to Maccabi Tel Aviv but was awarded 3–0 against PAOK for fielding the suspended player Liasos Louka.
2: Metalist Kharkiv were removed from the Champions League following their win over PAOK, after UEFA found them guilty of match fixing in the Ukrainian league in contravention of UEFA regulations. As a result, PAOK were reinstated in the Champions League.

Inter-Cities Fairs Cup / UEFA Cup / UEFA Europa League

1: The game was 2–0 to PSG in half-time. Due to episodes in Toumba Stadium between PAOK fans and police, Dutch referee John Blankenstein decided to stop game. In 4 of October UEFA awarded 3–0 to PSG.

UEFA Europa Conference League

European Cup Winners' Cup

Scorers

Opponents per country and per season

Last Update: 18 March 2022

Team statistics

By competition

Last updated: 28 July 2022
Biggest home win: 2015–16 Europa League, 23 July 2015, PAOK 6–0  Lokomotiva Zagreb  
Biggest away win: 1999–00 UEFA Cup, 16 September 1999,  Locomotive Tbilisi 0–7 PAOK
Biggest home defeat: 2018–19 UEFA Champions League, 29 August 2018, PAOK 1–4  Benfica
Biggest away defeat: 1965–66 Inter-Cities Fairs Cup, 29 September 1965,  Wiener 6–0 PAOK
Highest scoring games: 1997–98 UEFA Cup, 12 August 1997, PAOK 5–3  Spartak Trnava &                                       1997–98 UEFA Cup, 4 November 1997, PAOK 4–4  Atlético Madrid

By country

Last updated: 28 July 2022Source: Statistics at UEFA.com

Player and Coach statistics

Players and coach in bold are currently active for PAOK 
Last updated: 28 July 2022

Players who scored for and against PAOK in European competitions

The youngest players who scored for PAOK in European competitions

Players in bold are currently active for PAOK 
Last updated: 12 August 2021  Source: Statistics in Europe at paokfc.gr Source: Statistics at

Match statistics

European matches on penalty shoot-out

Attendance record
Top attendance records at home and away European matches (not available for all the matches; the rank could be different).

Penalties in European matches

Last updated: 3 December 2020

Red cards in European matches

UEFA club ranking

Last updated: 5 June 2022 
Season 2022–23 in progress 
Source: Club coefficients at

Notable wins
Notable wins

Biggest wins

References

European football
Greek football clubs in international competitions